Tomb of Mir Shams-ud-Din Araqi or Ziyarat e Mir Shams-ud-Din Araqi or Araqi Shrine is a religious site of Kashmiri Muslims located at Chadoora, Budgam. In this shrine there is buried Mir Shams-ud-Din Araqi and Malik Hyder, a Kashmiri Historian. The shrine was constructed by Aga Syed Yousuf to honor Mir Shams-ud-Din Araqi.

Background
Mir Syed Mohammad Isfani alias Mir Shams-ud-Din Araqi was an Iranian Sufi Muslim saint, known for having introduced the tenets held by Muhammad Noorbaksh Qahistani, a 15th-century Iranian Sufi who gave his name to the Noorbakshia school of Islam. Araqi was part of the order of Twelver Shia Sufis in Jammu and Kashmir who greatly influenced the social fabric of the Kashmir Valley and its surrounding regions.

Araqi died in 1515 and was buried at Zaddibal in Srinagar, Jammu and Kashmir. His body was later shifted to Chadoora for unknown reasons, where he is currently buried at the Araqi shrine. Araqi was a descendant of Musa al-Kadhim, the seventh Imam in Twelver Shia Islam.

Friday prayers
People offer Friday prayers at the shrine. Majlis is also held at the shrine. People across the valley come here to visit the shrine. Anjuman e Sharie Shian is the custodian of the shrine.

Architecture
This shrine is protected with cemented wall. There are many bathrooms attached to it. Many rooms have been built for pilgrims and travellers. The area of the shrine and its ground is about 10 kanals.

See also
 Aga Sahib Shrine
 Persecution of Kashmiri Shias
 Tafazzul Husain Kashmiri

References

Sufism in Jammu and Kashmir
Sufi shrines in India